Lambloo is a town and Sub Tehsil situated 10 km away from the Hamirpur District famous for ShaniDev temple which attracts pilgrims from nearby places, particularly on weekend days. A famous Shiva temple is situated in the nearby village Gasota while reaching Lambloo from the district headquarters.

References

Villages in Hamirpur district, Himachal Pradesh